Valerie Meredith (née Ross; born 22 April 1949) is a Canadian politician and realtor. Meredith served as a member of the House of Commons of Canada from 1993 to 2004.

Born in Edmonton, Alberta, Meredith was a town councillor in Slave Lake, Alberta from 1973 until 1977 when she became Mayor, serving until 1980.

In 1988, Meredith made an unsuccessful attempt to enter politics as a Reform party candidate in the Surrey—White Rock—South Langley riding. Her second campaign for the riding in 1993 was successful. She was re-elected in 1997 and 2000 in South Surrey—White Rock—Langley as the Reform party transitioned into the Canadian Alliance then the Conservative Party. In all, she was a member of the 35th, 36th and 37th Canadian Parliaments.

In early 2001, she temporarily joined the Democratic Representative Caucus group in protest of Stockwell Day's Alliance Party leadership.

Following electoral district restructuring and the formation of the new Conservative Party, Meredith attempted to become the Conservative candidate in South Surrey—White Rock—Cloverdale. She lost the party's riding nomination to Russ Hiebert and left federal politics after the 2004 general election. Following her departure from federal politics, she became a partner in The Parliamentary Group, a political lobby organisation based in Ottawa, Ontario.

Meredith's father is Joseph Donovan Ross, an Alberta cabinet minister who was a member of the Legislative Assembly of Alberta from 1952 until 1971. She has four children from a former marriage.

As of 2021, Meredith is a member of the board of directors of the Maverick Party.

References

External links
 
 The Parliamentary Group (current activity), accessed 16 July 2006
 Biography on the Maverick Party website

1949 births
Living people
Canadian Alliance MPs
Canadian real estate agents
Women members of the House of Commons of Canada
Conservative Party of Canada MPs
Members of the House of Commons of Canada from British Columbia
Politicians from Edmonton
Politicians from Surrey
Reform Party of Canada candidates in the 1988 Canadian federal election
Reform Party of Canada MPs
Women in British Columbia politics
20th-century Canadian women politicians
21st-century Canadian politicians
21st-century Canadian women politicians
Politicians affected by a party expulsion process